Homestead Steel Workers Football Club, better known as Homestead F.C. was the company soccer team for the Homestead Steel Works of Homestead, Pennsylvania.  It played in a variety of local amateur and semi-professional soccer leagues in Western Pennsylvania.  In 1915, Homestead won the Pittsburgh and District Association Football League (PDAFL) and in 1916 took the Western Pennsylvania State Cup.  In 1915, 1917 and 1919, Homestead was knocked out of the National Challenge Cup by Bethlehem Steel.

Year-by-year

Honors
League Championship
 Winner (1): 1915

Western Pennsylvania State Cup
 Winner (1): 1916

References

Defunct soccer clubs in Pennsylvania
Homestead, Pennsylvania